The 2000/01 NTFL season was the 80th season of the Northern Territory Football League (NTFL).

Palmerston has won its 2nd premiership title while defeating the Darwin Buffaloes in the grand final by 12 points.

Grand Final

References

Northern Territory Football League seasons
NTFL